Mordellina is a genus of tumbling flower beetles in the family Mordellidae.

Species
These species belong to the genus Mordellina:

References

Further reading

 
 
 
 
 

Mordellinae